Meet Glen Campbell is the sixtieth album by American singer/guitarist Glen Campbell, released in 2008. The album consisted of country covers of rock songs by Travis, Tom Petty, The Replacements, Jackson Browne, U2, The Velvet Underground, John Lennon, and Green Day. In 2012, Capitol Records reissued it with five bonus tracks, including live versions from the 2008 AOL Sessions of "Wichita Lineman", "Rhinestone Cowboy", and "All I Want Is You"), and new 2008 remixes of the tracks "Gentle on My Mind" and "Galveston".

Track listing

Side one
"Sing" (Francis Healy) – 3:45
"Walls" (Tom Petty) – 3:31
"Angel Dream" (Petty) – 2:29
"Times Like These" (Dave Grohl, Taylor Hawkins, Nate Mendel, Chris Shiflett) – 3:28
"These Days" (Jackson Browne) – 3:29

Side two
"Sadly Beautiful" (Paul Westerberg) – 3:20
"All I Want Is You" (Adam Clayton, David Evans, Paul Hewson, Larry Mullen, Jr.) – 4:15
"Jesus" (Lou Reed) – 3:10
"Good Riddance (Time of Your Life)" (Billie Joe Armstrong, Frank Wright, Mike Dirnt) – 2:35
"Grow Old with Me" (John Lennon) – 3:40

The limited edition vinyl edition, released August 5, includes a 2008 remix of "Galveston" (Jimmy Webb) as a bonus track. The Wal-Mart-only CD included 2008 remixes for "Gentle on My Mind", "By the Time I Get to Phoenix", "Wichita Lineman", "Galveston", and "Rhinestone Cowboy". In January 2012, Capitol reissued the album. Bonus tracks were the remixes of "Gentle on My Mind" and "Galveston" and three songs from a 2008 AOL Sessions concert: "Wichita Lineman", "Rhinestone Cowboy" and "All I Want Is You".

Personnel
Glen Campbell – vocals, electric guitar
Jason Falkner – electric guitar
Wendy Melvoin – electric guitar
George Doering – acoustic guitar, banjo, mandolin
Chris Chaney – bass guitar
Roger Joseph Manning Jr. – keyboards
Vinnie Colaiuta – drums
Luis Conte – percussion
Marty Rifkin – pedal steel
Rick Nielsen – guitar
Todd Youth – guitar
Kim Bullard – keyboards
Backing vocals – Robin Zander, Debby Campbell, Cal Campbell, Dillon Campbell, Ashley Campbell, Shannon Campbell

Production
Produced by Julian Raymond, Howard Willing
Mixed by Howard Willing, Julian Raymond
Recorded by Howard Willing
All songs arranged by Julian Raymond
Strings and horns arranged and conducted by Bennett Salvay
Mastered by Brian Gardner at Bernie Grundman Mastering
Mastered for vinyl by Ron McMaster at Capitol Mastering
A&R executive – Rick Camino
Art direction – Tom Recchion
Art and design – Chris Kro
Photography – Steve Silvas, Dax Kimbrough

Charts

Meet Glen Campbell debuted at No. 155 on the Billboard 200 chart dated September 6, 2008. Its debut UK chart position was No. 54. By August 2011, the album had sold 24,000 copies, according to Nielsen Soundscan.

References

Glen Campbell albums
2008 albums
Capitol Records albums
Covers albums
Albums recorded at Sunset Sound Recorders
Albums produced by Julian Raymond